Jamal Abdulrahman Mubarak (born 21 March 1974) is a Kuwaiti former footballer who played as a defender.

Career
Mubarak played club football for Al Tadhamon and Qadsia. He earned 107 caps for the Kuwaiti national team between 1994 and 2006, scoring 9 goals.

See also
 List of men's footballers with 100 or more international caps

References

External links
 

1974 births
Living people
Kuwaiti footballers
Kuwait international footballers
Olympic footballers of Kuwait
Footballers at the 2000 Summer Olympics
2000 AFC Asian Cup players
FIFA Century Club
Association football defenders
Al Tadhamon SC players
Qadsia SC players
Asian Games medalists in football
Footballers at the 1998 Asian Games
Asian Games silver medalists for Kuwait
Medalists at the 1998 Asian Games
Kuwait Premier League players